Lohuti may refer to:

Abolqasem Lahouti
Lohuti, Tajikistan